Apantesis favorita is a moth of the family Erebidae. It was described by Berthold Neumoegen in 1890. It is found in the Sand Hills of Nebraska, Nevada and north-eastern Colorado. The habitat consists of prairie sand dunes.

The forewings are dark brown to black dorsally with creamy buff to pinkish buff bands. The hindwings are deep pinkish red with black markings. Adults are on wing from mid-May to mid-June.

This species was formerly a member of the genus Grammia, but was moved to Apantesis along with the other species of the genera Grammia, Holarctia, and Notarctia.

References

Arctiina
Moths described in 1890